This is a list of women who were listed as communists or fellow travelers in the American anti-communist publication Red Channels: The Report of Communist Influence in Radio and Television in June 1950. As a result of being listed in the pages of this volume, many of these 41 women found it difficult to find employment in media industries.

Stella Adler: Actress, director
Edith Atwater: Actress
Vera Caspary: Writer, novelist
Mady Christians: Actress; council member, Actors' Equity Association
Louise Fitch: Actress
Ruth Gordon: Actress, writer 
Shirley Graham: Musician; writer; founding member of Sojourners for Truth and Justice
Uta Hagen: Actress, teacher 
Lillian Hellman: Playwright, author
Rose Hobart: Actress; board member, Screen Actors' Guild
Judy Holliday: Actress
Lena Horne: Singer, actress
Marsha Hunt: Actress
Donna Keath: Actress
Pert Kelton: Actress
Adelaide Klein: Actress
Gypsy Rose Lee: Burlesque artist; quiz show host; recording secretary American Guild of Variety Artists
Madeline Lee: Actress, social activist
Ray Lev: Concert pianist
Ella Logan: Singer
Aline MacMahon: Actress
Margo, sometimes known as Margo Albert: Actress, dancer
Jean Muir: Actress
Meg Mundy: Actress
Dorothy Parker: Writer; co-founder Hollywood Anti-Nazi League
Minerva Pious: Actress
Anne Revere: Actress; secretary, Screen Actors Guild
Selena Royle: Actress
Hazel Scott: Musician, actress
Lisa Sergio: Radio commentator
Ann Shepherd: Actress
Gale Sondergaard: Actress
Hester Sondergaard: Actress
Helen Tamiris: Choreographer
Betty Todd: Director; secretary, Radio and Television Directors Guild
Hilda Vaughn: Actress
Fredi Washington: Actress; journalist, The People's Voice; secretary, Negro Actors Guild of America
Margaret Webster: Author, director, producer
Ireene Wicker: Radio show host
Betty Winkler: Actress
Lesley Woods: Actress
Adelaide Bean: Actress

References

Anti-communism in the United States
 
History of Hollywood, Los Angeles
McCarthyism
Communists
Communists
1950 in the United States
1950 in American politics